Bloomington is a village in Franklin County, Nebraska, United States. The population was 103 at the 2010 census.

History
Bloomington was established in 1872 when it was certain that the railroad would be extended to that point. It was likely named after the city of Bloomington, Illinois.

It once served as county seat.

Geography
Bloomington is located at  (40.093615, -99.036617).

Demographics

2010 census
As of the census of 2010, there were 103 people, 49 households, and 27 families residing in the village. The racial makeup of the village was 97.1% White, 1.0% African American, 1.0% Native American, and 1.0% from two or more races.

There were 49 households, of which 16.3% had children under the age of 18 living with them, 51.0% were married couples living together, 4.1% had a female householder with no husband present, and 44.9% were non-families. 34.7% of all households were made up of individuals, and 18.4% had someone living alone who was 65 years of age or older. The average household size was 2.10 and the average family size was 2.70.

The median age in the village was 51.5 years. 14.6% of residents were under the age of 18; 5.8% were between the ages of 18 and 24; 14.6% were from 25 to 44; 39.8% were from 45 to 64; and 25.2% were 65 years of age or older. The gender makeup of the village was 53.4% male and 46.6% female.

2000 census
As of the census of 2000, there were 124 people, 60 households, and 34 families residing in the village. The population density was 155.6 people per square mile (59.8/km2). There were 80 housing units at an average density of 100.4 per square mile (38.6/km2). The racial makeup of the village was 97.58% White, 0.81% Native American, and 1.61% from two or more races.

There were 60 households, out of which 20.0% had children under the age of 18 living with them, 48.3% were married couples living together, 6.7% had a female householder with no husband present, and 41.7% were non-families. 33.3% of all households were made up of individuals, and 11.7% had someone living alone who was 65 years of age or older. The average household size was 2.07 and the average family size was 2.66.

In the village, the population was spread out, with 18.5% under the age of 18, 5.6% from 18 to 24, 23.4% from 25 to 44, 34.7% from 45 to 64, and 17.7% who were 65 years of age or older. The median age was 46 years. For every 100 females, there were 121.4 males. For every 100 females age 18 and over, there were 114.9 males.

As of 2000 the median income for a household in the village was $15,000, and the median income for a family was $24,250. Males had a median income of $20,208 versus $23,250 for females. The per capita income for the village was $13,334. There were 12.9% of families and 22.0% of the population living below the poverty line, including 30.8% of under eighteens and 19.2% of those over 64.

Notable person
Kid Willson, baseball player

References

Villages in Franklin County, Nebraska
Villages in Nebraska